Everybody's Doing It is a 1916 American short comedy film directed by Tod Browning.

Cast

 Howard Gaye as Society gentleman
 Tully Marshall as Crook
 Violet Radcliffe
 Georgie Stone
 Lilian Webster as Young woman

References

External links

1916 films
American silent short films
American black-and-white films
1916 comedy films
1916 short films
Films directed by Tod Browning
Silent American comedy films
American comedy short films
1910s American films